Border is a region of Eastern Cape province in South Africa, comprising roughly the eastern half of the province. Its main centre is East London.

Like the Boland region in Western Cape, Border does not have defined boundaries. The name has long been applied to sports teams that have represented the region in South African interprovincial competitions. The Border rugby union team has competed in interprovincial rugby union since 1891, and the Border cricket team has competed in interprovincial cricket since 1898. The Border Tennis Association is one of the 14 provincial members of Tennis South Africa.

Buster Farrer represented Border in six sports: cricket, tennis, squash, hockey, golf and bowls.

References

Geography of the Eastern Cape